Great Cumberland Place is a street in the City of Westminster, part of Greater London, England. There is also a hotel bearing the same name on the street.

Description
The street runs from Oxford Street at Marble Arch to George Street at Bryanston Square.

It contains the Western Marble Arch Synagogue, near which stands a statue of Raoul Wallenberg.

Great Cumberland Place is home to The Cumberland Hotel.

Notable residents

The street was the home of Thomas Pinckney while he was the United States ambassador to the Court of St James's.

Sir James Mackintosh lived in Great Cumberland Street, which was later re-numbered as part of Great Cumberland Place.

The residents listed in 1833 were: "Hans Busk, Esq.; Sir Clifford Constable; Sir Frederick Hamilton; Lady C. Underwood; Sir G. Ivison Tapps; Baron Bülow (the Prussian Minister); General Sir R. M'Farlane; Leonard Currie, Esq.; Sir S. B. Fludyer, Bart.; Lady Trollope; Earl of Leitrim; Sir Alexander Johnston; and the Hon. and Right Rev. the Lord Bishop of Norwich", and in Great Cumberland Street "Lord Saltoun; Mrs. Portman; John Wells, Esq.; Colonel Sherwood; Captain Richard Manby; John Lodge, Esq.; Major Murray; Robert Cutlar Fergusson, Esq.; John N. McLeod, Esq.; and Lord Bagot".

The explorers James Theodore Bent and Mabel Bent lived first at Number 43 and then Number 13 Great Cumberland Place from the early 1880s until Mabel Bent's death in 1929.

References

Streets in the City of Westminster